Rhode Island gained a second representative from the results of the 1790 census. Rhode Island did not divide itself into districts, but elected two at-large representatives.

See also 
 1792 and 1793 United States House of Representatives elections
 List of United States representatives from Rhode Island

Notes

References 

1792
Rhode Island
United States House of Representatives